Belmont is an unincorporated community in Hall County, in the U.S. state of Georgia.

History
A variant spelling was "Bellmont". A post office called " was established in 1886, and remained in operation until 1908. In 1900, the community had 90 inhabitants.

References

Unincorporated communities in Hall County, Georgia
Unincorporated communities in Georgia (U.S. state)